Marshallton Inn, also known as The General Wayne Inn, is a historic inn and tavern located in West Bradford Township, Chester County, Pennsylvania. The original section was built about 1790, and subsequently enlarged with five additions.  It is a 2 1/2-story, fieldstone and frame structure in an Early Federal style.  It was originally built as a residence, but converted to an inn and tavern by 1814.  It continues to operate as a tavern and restaurant.

It was added to the National Register of Historic Places in 1977.  It is located in the Marshallton Historic District.

References

External links
Marshallton Inn and Four Dogs Tavern website

Hotel buildings on the National Register of Historic Places in Pennsylvania
Hotel buildings completed in 1790
Buildings and structures in Chester County, Pennsylvania
Historic district contributing properties in Pennsylvania
1790 establishments in Pennsylvania
National Register of Historic Places in Chester County, Pennsylvania